Sikory may refer to:

Sikory, Kuyavian-Pomeranian Voivodeship (north-central Poland)
Sikory, Łódź Voivodeship (central Poland)
Sikory, Podlaskie Voivodeship (north-east Poland)
Sikory, Legionowo County in Masovian Voivodeship (east-central Poland)
Sikory, Płońsk County in Masovian Voivodeship (east-central Poland)
Sikory, Sokołów County in Masovian Voivodeship (east-central Poland)
Sikory, Drawsko County in West Pomeranian Voivodeship (north-west Poland)
Sikory, Gryfice County in West Pomeranian Voivodeship (north-west Poland)